Jason Gann is an Australian-born actor, comedian, writer and producer. He is best known for his role as the title character in the Australian comedy series Wilfred, directed by Tony Rogers, and the U.S. reboot of the same name.

Biography

Early life
Jason Gann was born in Toowoomba, Queensland, Australia, At 14, while attending an all-boys school, Gann discovered his love for comedy when he performed as Suzanne, leader of the can-can dancers in a high school production of Paint Your Wagon. After high school, he went on to study acting at the University of Southern Queensland. He earned a B.A. in Acting while also attending classes in humanities and the arts.

Early career
Immediately following his studies, Gann moved to Brisbane where he continued studying theatre and music. He worked in children's theatre at the Twelfth Night Theatre in Bowen Hills for several years, performing in dozens of shows. He also played lead roles and toured the country in several comedy theatre productions for that theatre company. He developed and starred in several seasons of the Arts Council-funded play Keep Everything You Love, for which he won the Del Arte Award for Best Male Actor 1997. Gann then worked for the Queensland Theatre Company as an actor in several development projects and starred in the Sven Swenson play The Vertigo and the Virginia for QTC in 1999.

Wilfred and Australian TV
In 2001, Gann wrote and produced several short films that screened in festivals internationally. In 2002 he co-wrote and starred in the short Wilfred.  He first came to national attention when he won Best Male Actor and the short won Best Comedy and the Peoples' Choice Award at Tropfest in 2002. Wilfred went on to screen at festivals including Sundance Film Festival in 2003.

Gann won the Tropfest Best Male Actor award again in 2003 for Buried. He then appeared in Australian feature films including Gettin' Square, Thunderstruck, The Illustrated Family Doctor, and Kenny.

In 2004, for Australian TV, Gann appeared in two episodes of Blue Heelers and had a cameo on Kath & Kim. In 2006, Gann wrote and starred in 52 episodes of the sketch comedy show The Wedge on Australia's Network Ten. Gann then created, produced, wrote and starred in the network's spin-off comedy series Mark Loves Sharon. The following year, Gann co-created and played the title character for the Australian comedy series Wilfred, based on the short film. It ran for two seasons, both of which went on to win awards at Tropfest in 2007 and 2009.

US Television
In 2010, Renegade Films sold the Australian format of Wilfred to the U.S. network FX. Faced with redeveloping the show for an American market without Tony Rogers, Gann teamed with Family Guy executive producer David Zuckerman. Actor Elijah Wood signed on to co-star with Gann. The Wilfred debut became FX's highest-rated comedy series debut.

Gann is managed by Jeff Kwatinetz at Prospect Park. Gann left ICM and signed with WME in 2012. After Wilfred, Gann has been commissioned to produce and develop new television series by networks including ABC.

Music career

By his own admission, Gann has always been involved in music. His participation in several music bands in Australia did not bring success. Gann took one of the bands very seriously and expected to release a cd with recordings, however, some tragic circumstances that occurred with one of the band members and his family forced to cancel the recording indefinitely. It was never released. During the filming of the series "Wilfred" Gann expressed the idea of re-assembling this music band, and wrote a letter to its former members planning to record vocals while being in California, however, to date there is no reliable information about the resumption of the project.

It is known about his participation in Sofamecca, which released three albums: Sofa Mecca (2002), Commuters (2005), Children Dust (2008) - all three with Gann's vocals. One of the songs entitled "Ashen" is featured in a pilot episode of the Australian series "Wilfred". All the albums are available for listening and buying online.

Business career 

As of 2020 Gann has left both acting and writing to pursue his CBD business Wilfred CBD & Hemp.

Awards and nominations
In 2007 and 2010, Gann was nominated for an AFI Award for Best Male Performance in a Comedy Series. In 2007 he won for Best Comedy Series, for Wilfred, and in 2010 he won for Best Screenplay in a Television Series. In 2011, Gann was nominated for a Silver Logie for Most Outstanding Actor for his work on Wilfred. He was awarded the Australian GQ Comedian of the Year Award for 2011, and was nominated for the annual Golden Collar Award, normally given solely to canine performers.

Personal life

Family and charity
Gann married Spanish model Alejandra Varela on 4 February 2013. The two had a son, Xano, born 13 August 2013. An animal lover, Gann dedicates time as a celebrity spokesperson for multiple animal rights groups including Stray Cat Alliance in Los Angeles, California, US.

Melbourne legal incident
In 2007, Gann pleaded guilty to assaulting a shuttle bus driver, Joseph Hosny. Gann's legal counsel advised him to plead guilty rather than fight the allegation, as a tough sentence could have threatened the production of Wilfred in the United States. In September 2014, Gann was reassessing his legal options. In March 2018, a California court ordered Gann to pay $594,452 (USD) to the bus driver.

Filmography

Film

Television

Theatre

References

External links
 

1971 births
Living people
Australian stand-up comedians
Australian musicians
Australian film directors
Australian television directors
Australian film producers
Australian television producers
Australian television writers
Australian male stage actors
Australian male film actors
Australian male television actors
Australian male comedians
Australian screenwriters
University of Southern Queensland alumni
21st-century Australian singers
Australian male television writers
21st-century Australian male singers